Fátima de Madrid is the name given to an Arab Muslim astronomer and mathematician who supposedly lived during the late 10th and early 11th centuries in Islamic Spain. She was purportedly the daughter of the astronomer Maslama al-Majriti, with whom she is said to have worked on several astronomical and mathematical treatises, including the astronomical tables of Muhammad ibn Musa al-Khwarizmi. The earliest known account of her is the 1924 edition of the Enciclopedia Espasa-Calpe, and historians have cast doubt on whether she actually existed.

Purported career 
Fátima de Madrid is said to have lived in Córdoba, under the Caliphate of Córdoba, during the late 10th and early 11th centuries. She is said to have been the daughter of the famous Islamic astronomer and scientist Maslama al-Majriti.

Her most famous supposed work, known as the "Corrections from Fátima," are a series of astronomical and mathematical treatises, though no copy of it has ever been found. She also supposedly co-authored "A Treatise on the Astrolabe" with her father, which contains information about how to use astrolabes. Today, the manuscript is still allegedly preserved in the library of the monastery of El Escorial.

Fátima supposedly helped her father edit and adapt the astronomical tables of al-Khwarizmi, replacing the Persian solar calendar used in his models with the Islamic lunar calendar. They supposedly corrected the tables also to account for the geographical location of Córdoba, as well as for the meridian passing through it. With her father, she also supposedly translated the numeration of Persian to Arab years and determined the positions of the planets on the day of the Hijra. Fátima also supposedly helped her father correct Ptolemy's Almagest, which contained mistakes in the calculations of eclipses.

In addition, Fátima supposedly wrote several zījes, a type of Islamic astronomical treatise. These covered topics including calendars, ephemerides of the planets, the Sun, and the Moon, and solar and lunar eclipses.

Apart from her work on astronomy, Fátima was said to be able to speak, read, or write in Arabic, Spanish, Hebrew, Greek, and Latin.

Historicity 
Whether Fátima de Madrid actually existed is contested. The earliest known reference to her existence is the 1924 edition of the Enciclopedia Espasa-Calpe. As Ángel Requena Fraile, a historian of mathematics, explains:

Arabist, historian, and biographer of Al-Andalus Manuela Marín similarly holds that Fátima is a historical invention from the Espasa-Calpe. Marín attributes continued discussion about her, such as on the internet and with her inclusion in a 2009 calendar titled "Astronomers who made history", to uncritical repetition of the Espasa-Calpe's content.

References 

10th-century people from al-Andalus
11th-century people from al-Andalus
Arab women
Astronomers from al-Andalus
Fictional mathematicians
People from Córdoba, Spain
People whose existence is disputed
Mathematicians from al-Andalus
Spanish women mathematicians
Women astronomers
Women mathematicians
Women from al-Andalus
Year of birth missing (living people)
Medieval women scientists